Abavus is a genus of flies in the family Stratiomyidae.

Species
Abavus maculatus Lindner, 1933
Abavus multisignatus Lindner, 1949
Abavus priscus Enderlein, 1914

References

Stratiomyidae
Brachycera genera
Taxa named by Günther Enderlein
Diptera of South America